Orkanger is a town and the administrative centre of Orkland municipality in Trøndelag county, Norway. The town is also a former municipality which existed from 1920 until 1963. The town sits at the end of the Orkdal Fjord, an arm of the Trondheimsfjord. Orkanger is the commercial centre of the municipality of Orkland and it is the site of the Orkanger Church. It was established as a "town" in 2014.

Combined with the neighbouring suburban village of Fannrem, the conurbation constitutes one of the largest urban areas in Trøndelag county.

Just north of Orkanger lies the port of Thamshavn. Until 1974, Orkanger had a station on the Thamshavn Line railway with the Thamshavn Station just north of the town. The railway line closed for passenger traffic in 1963 but continued to transport ore from Løkken Verk to the Thamshavn port until 1974 when the line was closed to all traffic.

Between 1908 and 1949 there was a steam ship service to Trondheim on the SS Orkla.

Industry
Orkanger is one of the most important industrial centres in Trøndelag. The industrial sites are mainly located in the Grønøra area, just west of the mouth of the Orkla river. Technip Offshore Norge AS, Reinertsen,  and the foundry Elkem Thamshavn AS are the main operators in the area.

A chipboard factory operated in Orkanger from 1959 until 1976.

History
The urban area of Orkanger was established as a municipality on 1 July 1920 when it was separated from Orkdal municipality. Initially, it had a population of 1,715. The municipality encompassed the  urban area and some of the surrounding countryside. It was an important port, but it did not have the designation of a town at that time. During the 1960s, there were many municipal mergers across Norway due to the work of the Schei Committee. On 1 January 1963, the municipality of Orkanger ceased to exist and it was merged into the larger municipality of Orkdal.  Prior to the merger, Orkanger had 2,874 residents. In 2014, the municipality of Orkdal declared Orkanger to be a "town".

Name
The town (and municipality) was named "Orkanger". The meaning of the name is of the lake and river is not certain.

Self-government (1920-1962)
While it existed, this municipality was responsible for primary education (through 10th grade), outpatient health services, senior citizen services, unemployment, social services, zoning, economic development, and municipal roads. During its existence, this municipality was governed by a municipal council of elected representatives, which in turn elected a mayor.

Municipal council
During its time as an independent municipality, the municipal council  of Orkanger was made up of representatives that were elected to four year terms.  The party breakdown of the final municipal council was as follows:

Mayors
The mayors of Orkanger during its time as a self-governing municipality:

 1920–1925: Christian Togstad (Ap)
 1926–1928: Martin Svebstad (Ap)
 1929–1931: Ole Axelsen Moe Richter (V)
 1932–1937: Oldus Larsen (Ap)
 1938–1941: Asgeir Jørum (Ap)
 1941–1945: Emil Carlsen (NS)
 1945–1945: Asgeir Jørum (Ap)
 1946–1955: Ole Monsen (Ap)
 1956–1962: Sverre Solligård (Ap)

Media gallery

See also
List of former municipalities of Norway

References

Cities and towns in Norway
Former municipalities of Norway
Orkland
Populated places in Trøndelag
1920 establishments in Norway
1963 disestablishments in Norway
2014 establishments in Norway